Der Ladenprinz (The Shop Prince) is a 1928 German silent film directed by Erich Schönfelder, starring Harry Halm, La Jana and Paul Henckels and also with La Jana, Sig Arno and Hermine Sterler. The film's art direction was by Andrej Andrejew.

Cast
 Harry Halm as Lucian, the Shop Prince 
 La Jana as Princess Tatjana 
 Paul Henckels as Martin Flamm 
 Hermine Sterler as Rosanna 
 Betty Bird as Lucian's cousin
 Adele Sandrock as Tatjana's aunt
 Ralph Arthur Roberts as Berggrün 
 Sig Arno as Berggrün's procurer 
 Ida Perry as Madame Charlotte 
 Carla Bartheel   
 Heinrich Gotho  
 Emmy Wyda

References

External links

1928 films
Films of the Weimar Republic
German silent feature films
Films directed by Erich Schönfelder
Films based on German novels
German black-and-white films